Mahmoud Gad Mahmoud Ahmed (born 1 October 1998) is an Egyptian footballer who plays as a goalkeeper for Egyptian Premier League club ENPPI.

References

Living people
1998 births
Egyptian footballers
Footballers at the 2020 Summer Olympics
Olympic footballers of Egypt
ENPPI SC players
Egyptian Premier League players
Association football goalkeepers
2021 Africa Cup of Nations players